Liceo Comercial B-34 Jorge Alessandri R. is a Chilean high school located in Rancagua, Cachapoal Province, Chile.

References 

Educational institutions with year of establishment missing
Secondary schools in Chile
Schools in Cachapoal Province